Saddam (Arabic: صدام, Ṣaddām) is an Arabic title that means "one who confronts". Other meanings include: "one who frequently causes collisions", "powerful collider", and "powerful confronter." The name has risen in popularity in some Sunni populations after the Iraq War and the former president's execution.

People
 Saddam Hussein (19372006), 5th President of Iraq
 Saddam Hussain (athlete) (born 1991), Pakistani runner
 Saddam Hussain (footballer) (born 1993), Pakistani footballer
 Saddam Hossain (cricketer, born 1994), Bangladeshi cricketer
 Saddam Hossain (cricketer, born 1995), Bangladeshi cricketer
 Saddam Kamel (19561996), former head of the Iraqi Republican Guard, relative of Saddam Hussein
 Saddam Kietyongyuth (born 1983), Thai boxer
 Saddam al-Jamal (born 1987), Islamic militant
 Saddam Abdel-Muhsan (born 1991), Jordanian footballer
 Saddam Afridi, Pakistani cricketer
 Sadam Ali (born 1988), Yemeni-American boxer
 Sadam Koumi (born 1994), Sudanese sprinter
 Sadam Sulley (born 1996), Ghanaian footballer
 Sadam Mangal (born 1998), Afghan cricketer
 Saddem Hmissi (born 1991), Tunisian volleyball player

References

Arabic masculine given names